Bolinopsis vitrea, is a species of comb jelly in the family Bolinopsidae. It is found in the Atlantic Ocean and was first described by the American biologist Louis Agassiz in 1860.

Distribution
In Florida waters, Bolinopsis vitrea is the most common ctenophore.

References

Bolinopsis
Fauna of the Atlantic Ocean
Taxa named by Louis Agassiz
Animals described in 1860